Charley Moon is a 1956 British musical film directed by Guy Hamilton. It stars Max Bygraves, Dennis Price and Shirley Eaton. The screenplay and lyrics are by Leslie Bricusse. The story is based on Reginald Arkell's backstage novel of the same name. It was filmed at Pinewood Studios, and on location in Upton Grey and Greywell, Hampshire.

Plot summary
Charley Moon (Max Bygraves) is a country boy who, after a national service stint in the army, becomes a small-time music-hall performer. After a few lucky breaks, he finds himself popular and the star of a musical hit in London's West End. Initially successful, Moon soon decides that showbiz is a facile occupation, and he longs to return to his childhood home. He eventually finds himself back where he started.

Cast

 Max Bygraves as Charley Moon 
 Dennis Price as Harold Armytage 
 Michael Medwin as Alf Higgins 
 Florence Desmond as Mary Minton 
 Shirley Eaton as Angel Dream 
 Patricia Driscoll as Rose 
 Charles Victor as Miller Moon 
 Reginald Beckwith as Vicar 
 Cyril Raymond as Bill 
 Eric Sykes as Brother-in-law
 Peter Jones as Stewart
 Jane Asher as Benesta
 Anthony Bygraves as Young Charley Moon

Notes

1956 films
1956 drama films
Films directed by Guy Hamilton
British drama films
1950s English-language films
1950s British films